Caladenia fuliginosa is a plant in the orchid family Orchidaceae and is endemic to the Yorke Peninsula in South Australia. It is a ground orchid with a single hairy leaf and a single relatively large, creamy-yellow flower, sometimes with reddish lines. The flowers have a smell resembling hot metal.

Description
The petals and sepals have thick, blackish glandular tips. Flowering occurs in late August and September.

Taxonomy and naming
Caladenia fuliginosa was first formally described in 2006 by David Jones, who gave it the name Arachnorchis fuliginosa and published the description in Australian Orchid Research from a specimen collected near Corny Point. In 2008, Robert Bates changed the name to Caladenia fuliginosa. The specific epithet (fuliginosa) is a Latin word meaning "sooty", referring to the blackish glandular tips on the sepals and petals.

Distribution and habitat
This spider orchid is only known from the southern part of the Flinders Ranges where it grows between rocks in sloping forest.

References

fuliginosa
Endemic orchids of Australia
Orchids of South Australia
Plants described in 2006
Taxa named by David L. Jones (botanist)
Taxa named by Robert John Bates